Gidley is a surname. Notable people with the surname include:

Charles Gidley Wheeler (born 1938), television screenwriter and historical novelist
Hogan Gidley, executive director of the South Carolina Republican Party
James W. Gidley (1866–1931), American paleontologist
Kurt Gidley (born 1982), professional Australian footballer and captain of the Newcastle Knights in the NRL
Martyn Gidley (born 1968), English first class cricketer who played in England and South Africa
Matthew Gidley (born 1977), Australian professional rugby league footballer for St Helens RLFC of the Super League competition
Memo Gidley (born 1970), Mexican-American racing driver of German and Canadian ancestry
Pamela Gidley (1965–2018), American actress and model
Philip Gidley King RN (1758–1808), British naval officer and colonial administrator
Sandra Gidley (born 1957), Liberal Democrat politician in the United Kingdom